Benjamin Gillery (born September 19, 1965 in Detroit, Michigan) is a retired American professional basketball player. A 7'0" center from Hutchinson Community College and Georgetown University, Gillery was mainly a "project" player for the Hoyas, starting games but benched during the first stoppage of time. Although Gillery was never drafted by an NBA team, he played for the Sacramento Kings during the 1988-89 NBA season, averaging 1.0 points in 25 games.  Gillery later played in the Continental Basketball Association for the San Jose Jammers, Rapid City Thrillers and Cedar Rapids Silver Bullets. He now coaches young boys in basketball.

Gillery appeared on an episode of TV show Cristina's Court when his sister sued him for charges ($3,100) related to a vehicle leased by her for his use.

Notes

External links
NBA stats @ basketballreference.com

1965 births
Living people
African-American basketball players
American expatriate basketball people in Argentina
Basketball players from Detroit
Cedar Rapids Silver Bullets players
Centers (basketball)
Georgetown Hoyas men's basketball players
Hutchinson Blue Dragons men's basketball players
Rapid City Thrillers players
Sacramento Kings players
San Jose Jammers players
Central High School (Detroit) alumni
Undrafted National Basketball Association players
American men's basketball players
21st-century African-American people
20th-century African-American sportspeople